Alder Creek is a perennial stream in Nevada County, California, mostly within the town of Truckee.  Its source region near Donner Ridge is west of town, and its mouth at Prosser Creek Reservoir is north of town.  It flows to the Truckee River via Prosser Creek.

Donner Party camp

The Donner Party camped in Alder Creek Valley when stopped by snow in November, 1846.  There is a memorial to them off California route 89 just north of the creek.

References

Rivers of Nevada County, California